The 2009–10 Spanish football season is Xerez's first season ever in Liga BBVA.

Trophies balance

Summer transfers

In

Out

Loan in

Loan return

Loan end

Winter transfers

Loan in

Loan end

Current squad

Match results
All times are in CET

Pre-season

Friendly matches

Puerto Real Trophy

Trofeo de la Vendimia

2nd Antonio Puerta Trophy

La Liga

With Cuco Ziganda

With Antonio Poyatos

With Néstor Gorosito

Copa del Rey

Round of 32 

Osasuna won 3–1 on aggregate.

References
1: Oladi was testing with Xerez, but the chairman transferred it to Malavan on summer because he doesn't overcome the target performance.

2: Neutral venue.

3: The team that wins this variable will be qualified ahead of another with the same points but lost on goal average. If the goal average is drawn between two or more teams and, at the end of the season these teams have the same points, the overall Liga BBVA's goal average prevails over this goal average.

4: Played on December 2, 2009, by 2009 FIFA Club World Cup FC Barcelona's participation.

5: Lionnel Franck passes with the reserve team during current season.

Xerez CD seasons
Xerez CD